Four Bullets for Joe ( or Cuatro balazos) is a 1964 Spanish-Italian Western film directed by Agustín Navarro, scored by Manuel Parada, screenplayed by Fernando Galiana, Mario Guerra, José Mallorquí, Julio Porter, Vittorio Vighi and portrayed by Paul Piaget, Fernando Casanova, Liz Poitel, Barbara Nelli, Ángela Cavo and Britt Ekland.

Cast

References

External links 
 

Films shot in Madrid
Films directed by Agustín Navarro
Spanish Western (genre) films
Italian Western (genre) films
Spaghetti Western films
1964 films
1960s Spanish-language films
1964 Western (genre) films
1960s Italian films